Harry Slatkin (born August 14, 1960) is an American businessman, entrepreneur and philanthropist.

The New York Times called him the "king" of home fragrance  and celebrities like Oprah Winfrey and Elton John use his home fragrances. Founder and creative force behind Slatkin & Co, a home fragrance brand, Slatkin is regarded as one of the country's fragrance experts.

A former Bear Stearns Director, he created Slatkin & Co in 1992. Launched at Saks Fifth Avenue, the brand was picked up by specialty retailers and international stores. Fans of the brand included Martha Stewart, Ralph Lauren, Tory Burch, Elton John, the Christian Dior company, flocked to Slatkin to create home fragrance collections. In 2005, retailer Les Wexner purchased Slatkin & Co. for L Brands. He named Slatkin President of Home Design for Limited Brands as well as President of Slatkin & Co.

Slatkin is a contributing editor at Elle Décor Magazine and appears regularly on QVC.  He has made guest appearances on such shows as CNN, The Martha Stewart Show, Extra TV, E! News, CNBC, ABC and Comedy Central. 
 
In June 2011, Harry Slatkin, with Tommy Hilfiger and the Labelux Group, acquired Belstaff, a British outerwear brand. Slatkin assumed the role of Chief Executive Officer and, in July 2011, tapped Martin Cooper as Chief Creative Officer. In 2014 Slatkin sold his shares back to Labelux.

Slatkin is the current owner and CEO of HomeWorx, Scentworx, and Slatkin & Co home fragrance and bath and body brands.
  
Slatkin and his wife serve on the boards of various non-profit organizations including Autism Speaks, Henry Street Settlement House,NEXT for Autism]), which Slatkin and his wife founded and then built the first charter school for autism in New York State.The Slatkins also partnered with Weill Cornell Medicine and Columbia University Vagelos College of Physicians and Surgeons to open the Center For Autism and the Developing Brain.

References

External links

1960 births
Living people
Businesspeople from New York City
Philanthropists from New York (state)